Leo Skiri Østigård (born 28 November 1999) is a Norwegian professional footballer who plays as a centre back for  club Napoli and the Norway national team.

Club career

Early career
In the winter of 2017, Østigård signed a three-year contract with Molde FK. Ahead of the 2018 season, he went on loan to Viking FK in 1. divisjon.

Brighton & Hove Albion
After the loan with Viking expired, Østigård signed for Brighton & Hove Albion.

Loan to St. Pauli
On 19 July 2019, FC St. Pauli signed Østigård on a loan deal until the end of 2019–20 season. He made his debut for the Hamburg based club on 31 August coming on as a substitute in a 3–3 draw against Dynamo Dresden. He made his first start for St. Pauli which was against fierce rivals Hamburger SV where Kiezkicker won 2–0, claiming a first home win in 59 years against their local side.

Loan to Coventry City
On 27 August 2020, Østigård joined Championship side Coventry City on a season-long loan deal. He made his debut on 12 September in which was his first senior game in English football where he played the full game in a 2–1 away defeat at Bristol City.
On 27 February 2021, Østigård was sent off in a 1–1 away draw at Blackburn Rovers after picking up a second yellow card. Østigård scored his first goal in English football on 5 April opening the scoreline in an eventual 3–1 home victory over Bristol City. Østigård returned to The Seagulls with two remaining games of the season due to a thigh injury. He made 39 appearances in the league scoring two goals – 40 apprarances, two goals overall – helping The Sky Blues to safety on their return to the Championship after eight years.

Loan to Stoke City
On 10 August 2021, Østigård joined Stoke City on loan for the 2021–22 season. He made his debut that evening, playing the whole match of the 2–1 EFL Cup first round victory at home over League One side Fleetwood Town in what was also his League Cup debut. Four days later he made his league debut for The Potters keeping a clean sheet in a 0–0 stalemate away at Birmingham City. On his third appearance he scored Stoke's third goal knocking in a rebound in a 3–1 away victory over Swansea City on 17 August. On 27 December 2021, Østigård was recalled from his loan spell by Brighton.

Loan to Genoa
Østigård signed for Serie A side Genoa on loan for the rest of the season on 5 January, after progressive previous loan spells and this signing giving him the chance to play at the top level. He made his debut four days later, playing the whole match of the 1–0 home loss against Spezia in the league, in what was his 100th club career appearance. 
In the week day away fixture against Milan in the Coppa Italia Round of 16 on 13 January, Østigård scored his first ever domestic cup goal opening the scoring in the eventual 3–1 after extra-time loss. He came on as a substitute in the 0–0 away draw at Roma on 5 February, where he was shown a straight red card on the 68th minute. Østigård was sent off for a second time in five matches, this time being shown two yellows after just 24 minutes of play in the 1–0 home victory over Torino on 18 March.

Napoli
On 10 July 2022, Østigård transferred to Napoli in Serie A on a permanent transfer. On 26 October 2022, he scored a goal on his Champions League debut in a 3–0 win against Rangers.

International career

After being capped at all youth levels he made his senior debut for the Norwegian national team playing the whole match helping keep a clean sheet in a 2–0 friendly win at home over Slovakia on 25 March 2022. He scored his first senior international goal on his eighth appearance on 17 November, heading home from a Martin Ødegaard corner in the 2–1 friendly win away at the Republic of Ireland.

Career statistics

Club

International

Norway score listed first, score column indicates score after each Østigård goal.

References

External links
Profile at the S.S.C. Napoli website

1999 births
Living people
People from Molde
Norwegian footballers
Norway youth international footballers
Norway under-21 international footballers
Association football forwards
Molde FK players
Viking FK players
FC St. Pauli players
Coventry City F.C. players
Stoke City F.C. players
Brighton & Hove Albion F.C. players
Genoa C.F.C. players
S.S.C. Napoli players
Eliteserien players
Norwegian First Division players
English Football League players
2. Bundesliga players
Serie A players
Norwegian expatriate footballers
Expatriate footballers in England
Norwegian expatriate sportspeople in England
Expatriate footballers in Germany
Norwegian expatriate sportspeople in Germany
Expatriate footballers in Italy
Norwegian expatriate sportspeople in Italy
Sportspeople from Møre og Romsdal